Zbigniew Boniek (born 3 March 1956) is a Polish former footballer and manager as well as current UEFA vice-president. A former midfielder, who was also capable of playing mostly as a right winger and second striker, he is considered one of the greatest Polish players of all time, and was selected by Pelé as one of the 100 best living footballers in 2004.

In an 80-cap international career, he scored 24 goals and played at three consecutive World Cups, helping Poland to 3rd place in 1982 and making the Team of the Tournament. His greatest achievements in club football were at Juventus in Italy, winning the Serie A, Coppa Italia, European Cup, European Cup Winners' Cup, and European Super Cup between 1983 and 1985, being the first Polish footballer to win a confederation title and one of the first Central and Eastern European players to do so with a non-conational club.

In the early 1990s he managed several Italian clubs, and also the Polish national team in 2002. In 2019 he was inducted in the Italian Football Hall of Fame.

Club career
Boniek was born in Bydgoszcz. He first played for Polish clubs Zawisza Bydgoszcz and later at Widzew Łódź.

Boniek transferred to Italian football giants Juventus in 1982. With Juventus he won the Coppa Italia in his first season, also managing a second-place finish in the league and reaching the 1983 European Cup Final in the same season. The following season, his performances proved decisive, as Juventus won both the Serie A title and the Cup Winners' Cup in 1984, with Boniek scoring the matching-winning goal in the 2–1 victory over Porto in the final of the latter tournament in Basel; he followed up these victories by claiming the European Super Cup later that year, scoring twice in the 2–0 win against Liverpool. He also won the European Cup in 1985, against Liverpool once again, winning the penalty that Michel Platini subsequently converted to win the title for Juventus, although the team's victory was overshadowed by the Heysel Disaster.

The following season, Boniek joined Roma, where he won a second Coppa Italia in 1986, and eventually ended his professional career with the club in 1988.

International career

Boniek represented the Poland national team in 80 international matches between 1976 and 1988, and scored 24 goals. He took part at the 1978, 1982, and 1986 FIFA World Cups with Poland.

Although he initially only appeared as a substitute in Poland's two opening group matches at the 1978 FIFA World Cup, he drew attention to himself when he scored two goals in a 3–1 victory over Mexico in Poland's final match of the group stage, helping his nation top their group; in the second round, however, Poland finished third in their group and were eliminated from the tournament.

Boniek later starred in the Polish team that won a bronze medal at the 1982 FIFA World Cup in Spain: he helped his team reach the semi-finals of the tournament, scoring four goals in the process. In the first round, he scored in a 5–1 win over Peru on 22 June, to help Poland top their group; in the second round, he scored a hat-trick in his nation's 3–0 second round victory over Belgium, in Barcelona, on 28 June, but was forced to miss the semi-final defeat to eventual champions Italy due to a suspension after being booked in the 88th minute of a 0–0 draw against the Soviet Union.

He returned to the starting line-up for the victorious third-place match against France and was named to the team of the tournament for his performances throughout the competition. The 1986 FIFA World Cup was less successful, as Poland only qualified for the second round as the second best third-placed team, and were subsequently eliminated in the second round following a 4–0 defeat to Brazil.

Style of play
Although Boniek was usually deployed as a midfielder, he was also able to play as a forward. He preferred to operate between the lines in a free role, although he was a versatile player, capable of playing in several offensive and midfield positions on either flank or through the centre, and throughout his career he was deployed as an attacking midfielder, as a right winger, in a playmaking role as a central midfielder, as a centre-forward, or as a second striker; his Juventus manager, Giovanni Trapattoni, however, often struggled to find the most suitable position for him.

Boniek was known for his extroverted personality and his trademark moustache, which made him a highly recognisable player. A tall, brave and hard-working footballer with a large, powerful, and slender physique, he was known for his blistering pace, acceleration, and quick reactions. In particular, Boniek was highly regarded for his ability to make sudden attacking runs to beat the defensive line and get on the end of his teammates' long passes, especially those of Michel Platini, with whom he formed a close friendship and formidable partnership at the Turin club, which made him lethal on counterattacks; this prompted Diego Maradona to describe Boniek as the best counterattacking player in the world.

A highly talented, creative, intelligent, and skilful footballer, he was one of the best dribblers of his time and also displayed superb technique, flair, and class. Although he was not a particularly prolific player, he was known for his eye for goal, and as his clinical finishing with either foot, as well as his head, which enabled him to maintain a consistent goalscoring rate throughout his career; he also earned a reputation for having the tendency to score decisive goals for his team in key matches.

Despite his ability, at times he was also criticised, however, for being tactically undisciplined, inconsistent, too static in his movements off the ball, and for not being involved enough in his team's play during matches, which led him to struggle against opponents who did not give him a lot of space.

The Juventus president at the time of Boniek's tenure with the club, Gianni Agnelli, nicknamed him Bello di notte ("Beauty at night", which is a play on the title of the Buñuel movie Belle de Jour) because of his excellent performances in European club tournament matches, which were played in the evening; indeed, during continental tournaments, his opponents usually allowed him more space and time on the ball than in Serie A, which allowed him to get forward, undertake individual dribbling runs and score goals himself, or drop deep, link up with midfielders and create chances or provide assists for his teammates, courtesy of his passing, vision, and clever movement. He was also nicknamed Zibì by the Italian press.

Towards the end of his career, as he lost his pace, he often functioned in a defensive role as a sweeper.

Managerial career
Following his retirement, Boniek pursued a coaching career, but with less success; he also coached in Italy, with stints at Lecce in 1990–91, Bari in 1991–92, Sambenedettese in 1992–93, and Avellino in 1994–96.

Boniek has served as vice-president of the Polish Football Association, and in July 2002 he became the manager of Poland. He resigned in December 2002, after just five matches (2 wins, 1 draw, 2 defeats, including a 1–0 home loss against Latvia in a European Championship qualifier).

Later career
Following his retirement, Boniek had a successful business career. He later also worked as a pundit and football commentator. According to Polish sources, Boniek had been favoured to become the new Minister of Sport for his country, but he denied the claims and stated that he had no intention of taking the job.

In 2004, Boniek was named by Pelé as one of the 125 Greatest Living Footballers, as part of FIFA's centenary celebrations. On 12 October 2009, he received the Golden Foot 'Legend' career award.

On 26 October 2012, he became the chairman of the Polish Football Association. He is popular for speaking in favour of decriminalising football fans by legalising pyrotechnics inside stadiums, a common practice among ultras. His term of office ended on 18 August 2021, and he was succeeded by Cezary Kulesza.

Personal life
Boniek has a university diploma in education. His father, Józef Boniek, was also a professional football player and later a manager.

Legacy
Honduran international footballer Óscar Boniek García was given the middle name Boniek in honour of Zbigniew Boniek. García chose to have the name "Boniek" written across the back of his jersey while playing for Houston.

Boniek Forbes (born 30 September 1983) is a Guinea-Bissau footballer who plays as a winger for Cheshunt. He played for Leyton Orient in the Football League.

Career statistics

Club

International goals
Scores and results list Poland's goal tally first, score column indicates score after each Boniek goal.

Honours

Widzew Łódź
Ekstraklasa: 1980–81, 1981–82

Juventus
Serie A: 1983–84
Coppa Italia: 1982–83
European Cup: 1984–85
European Super Cup: 1984
European Cup Winners' Cup: 1983–84

Roma
Coppa Italia: 1985–86

Individual
Piłka nożna magazine plebiscite: 1978, 1982
Ballon d'Or: Third place 1982
FIFA World Cup All-star Team: 1982
FIFA 100: 2004
Golden Foot Legends Award: 2009
FAI International Football Awards – International Personality: 2012
Italian Football Hall of Fame: 2019

Orders
 Boniek was awarded the Knight's Cross of the Order of Polonia Restituta: 1982  Krzyż Kawalerski Orderu Odrodzenia Polski
 Boniek is a 3rd class knight of Order of Merit of the Italian Republic: 1997  Commendatore Ordine al Merito della Repubblica Italiana

Notes

References

External links

 
 A song (in Polish) dedicated to Boniek
 BBC: Pele's list of the greatest

1956 births
Living people
Sportspeople from Bydgoszcz
Association football midfielders
Association football forwards
FIFA 100
Polish footballers
Polish football managers
Polish expatriate sportspeople in Italy
Poland international footballers
Zawisza Bydgoszcz players
Widzew Łódź players
A.S. Roma players
Juventus F.C. players
Serie A players
Expatriate footballers in Italy
U.S. Lecce managers
S.S.C. Bari managers
A.S. Sambenedettese managers
U.S. Avellino 1912 managers
Serie A managers
Expatriate football managers in Italy
Poland national football team managers
1978 FIFA World Cup players
1982 FIFA World Cup players
1986 FIFA World Cup players
Polish expatriate footballers
Ekstraklasa players
Polish Roman Catholics
Polish expatriate football managers